The Basketball Bundesliga (BBL) (English language: Federal Basketball League), for sponsorship reasons named  easyCredit BBL, is the highest level league of professional club basketball in Germany. The league comprises 18 teams. A BBL season is split into a league stage and a playoff stage. At the end of the league stage, the top eight teams qualify for the playoff stage, and the teams positioned in the 17th and 18th places are relegated to a lower-tier league. The playoffs are played in a "Best of five" format. The winning team of the final round are crowned the German Champions of that season.

In addition to the league competition, all BBL teams compete for the German Basketball Cup. Teams playing in the second league (ProA or ProB), or in a lower level Regionalliga, are also eligible to participate in the BBL-Cup. There are always 3 knock-out rounds that are played for the BBL-Cup. If more teams from the leagues below the BBL level apply for participation, then available places, and additional qualification rounds are added for them. The final four remaining teams determine the rankings for bronze, silver, and gold medals, in knock-out matches that are termed the BBL-TOP4. The gold winning team is the German Basketball Cup winner.

The Basketball Bundesliga is run by the Basketball Bundesliga GmbH. 74% of BBL GmbH is owned by the AG BBL e.V. (which is composed of the clubs), and 26% by the German Basketball Federation (DBB).

History

In Germany, a national domestic basketball championship was first organised in 1939, and it was won by LSV Spandau. By 1944, almost all basketball activity in the country was forced to an end, due to the Second World War. In 1947, MTSV Schwabing München became the first champion of post-war divided Germany.

The creation of a split West German federal-league, consisting of one northern division and one southern division, each comprising 10 teams, was decided on by the German Basketball Federation (DBB) in 1964. On October 1, 1966, the first season of the so-called Basketball Bundesliga started. Starting with the 1971–72 season, the size of each division was reduced to 8 teams.

With the 1975–76 season, the league structure was changed into a ten team first league (1. Basketball Bundesliga), and a 20 team second league (2. Basketball Bundesliga). Only the second league was split into a northern and a southern division, of 10 teams each. In 1985, the top league was enlarged to a size of 12 teams, and two years later, each division of the second league was also enlarged to 12 teams.

In 1988, the championship mode "Best of five" was applied for the first time. Starting with the 1995–96 season, the first league consisted of 14 teams. The Basketball Bundesliga GmbH (BBL) was founded in October 1996.

The federal leagues received their own administration within the framework of the German Basketball Federation in 1997. Since then, the second league divisions have been administered by the "AG 2. Bundesliga", while the BBL has been responsible for the first league. Two years later, a contract was signed between the BBL and the German Basketball Federation, in which the federation transferred its marketing/events rights to the BBL, for a 10-year duration, and in return, the BBL agreed to pay an annual "amateur support fee" of DM 600,000 (€ 306,775).

Starting with the 2003–04 season, the top league was increased to 16 teams, and in 2006–07, it was further increased to its present size of 18 teams. For the following 2007–08 season, the structure of the second league was reshaped from its northern/southern divisions, into a ProA division, and a ProB division. These divisions remained under the administration by "AG 2. Bundesliga".

Between 1994 and 2001, the highest level German basketball league was called "Veltins Basketball Bundesliga", and from 2001, until 2003, the league was known as "s.Oliver Basketball Bundesliga". Bayer Giants Leverkusen hold the league titles won record, being the winner of 14 German Basketball Championships. However, since 1997, Alba Berlin has dominated the league, winning their 8th title in 2008. Twenty-one teams have won the championship, since its inception.

Since 2009, Brose Bamberg dominated the competition and won the title in four straight seasons (2009-2013).

Sponsorship
In 2016, the BBL joined forces with Tipbet, a Malta-based betting company. This made Tipbet the Official Betting and Premium Sponsor of the league; the sponsorship agreement results in advertising activities throughout the arenas and online, and runs until 2018.

Arena rules
Currently, all Bundesliga clubs must play in arenas that seat at least 3,000 people.

Logos, names, and sponsorship names
1966–2009Basketball Bundesliga
2009–2016Beko BBL
2016–2021easyCredit BBL

Clubs
Members of the 2022–23 Basketball Bundesliga.

Title holders

 1938–39: LSV Spandau
 1939-46: Not held due to World War II
 1946–47: MTSV Schwabing
 1947–48: Turnerbund Heidelberg
 1948–49: MTSV Schwabing
 1949–50: Stuttgart-Degerloch
 1950–51: Turnerbund Heidelberg
 1951–52: Turnerbund Heidelberg
 1952–53: Turnerbund Heidelberg
 1953–54: Bayern Munich
 1954–55: Bayern Munich
 1955–56: ATV Düsseldorf
 1956–57: USC Heidelberg
 1957–58: USC Heidelberg
 1958–59: USC Heidelberg
 1959–60: USC Heidelberg
 1960–61: USC Heidelberg
 1961–62: USC Heidelberg
 1962–63: Alemannia Aachen
 1963–64: Alemannia Aachen
 1964–65: Gießen 46ers
 1965–66: USC Heidelberg
 1966–67: Gießen 46ers
 1967–68: Gießen 46ers
 1968–69: VfL Osnabrück
 1969–70: TuS 04 Leverkusen
 1970–71: TuS 04 Leverkusen
 1971–72: TuS 04 Leverkusen
 1972–73: USC Heidelberg
 1973–74: SSV Hagen
 1974–75: Gießen 46ers
 1975–76: TuS 04 Leverkusen
 1976–77: USC Heidelberg
 1977–78: Gießen 46ers
 1978–79: TuS 04 Leverkusen
 1979–80: ASC 1846 Göttingen
 1980–81: Saturn 77 Köln
 1981–82: Saturn 77 Köln
 1982–83: ASC 1846 Göttingen
 1983–84: ASC 1846 Göttingen
 1984–85: Bayer 04 Leverkusen
 1985–86: Bayer 04 Leverkusen
 1986–87: Saturn 77 Köln
 1987–88: Saturn 77 Köln
 1988–89: Steiner Bayreuth
 1989–90: Bayer 04 Leverkusen
 1990–91: Bayer 04 Leverkusen
 1991–92: Bayer 04 Leverkusen
 1992–93: Bayer 04 Leverkusen
 1993–94: Bayer 04 Leverkusen
 1994–95: Bayer 04 Leverkusen
 1995–96: Bayer 04 Leverkusen
 1996–97: Alba Berlin
 1997–98: Alba Berlin
 1998–99: Alba Berlin
 1999–00: Alba Berlin
 2000–01: Alba Berlin
 2001–02: Alba Berlin
 2002–03: Alba Berlin
 2003–04: Opel Skyliners
 2004–05: GHP Bamberg
 2005–06: RheinEnergie Köln
 2006–07: Brose Baskets
 2007–08: Alba Berlin
 2008–09: EWE Baskets Oldenburg
 2009–10: Brose Baskets
 2010–11: Brose Baskets
 2011–12: Brose Baskets
 2012–13: Brose Baskets
 2013–14: Bayern Munich
 2014–15: Brose Baskets
 2015–16: Brose Baskets
 2016–17: Brose Bamberg
 2017–18: Bayern Munich
 2018–19: Bayern Munich
 2019–20: Alba Berlin
 2020–21: Alba Berlin
 2021–22: Alba Berlin

Titles by club

Finals

Awards

Finals MVPs

Player nationality by national team.

See also
Basketball in Germany
German Basketball League Champions
German Basketball League Awards
German Basketball Cup
German Basketball Supercup
German League All-Star Game

References

External links
Official website 

 
Basketball leagues in Germany
Professional sports leagues in Germany